Moreno Moser (born 25 December 1990) is an Italian former professional road racing cyclist, who rode professionally between 2012 and 2019 for the , ,  and the  teams.

Born in Trento, Moser comes from a family of professional cyclists; his uncles Francesco and Aldo both finished in the top five overall placings of Grand Tour events, with Francesco winning the Giro d'Italia in 1984, and another uncle, Enzo, also wore the leader's jersey in the Giro. His father Diego, brothers Leonardo and Matteo and cousin Ignazio also competed professionally. He was named in the start list for the 2015 Vuelta a España.

Career

Early career
Having competed for U.S. Montecorona as a junior and Arvedi Lucchini Unidelta as an amateur, Moser joined professional team  in the second half of 2011 as a stagiaire. Moser remained with  after his stint as a stagiaire, having signed a two-year professional deal from 2012.

2012 season
Moser achieved his first professional victory in February 2012, at the Trofeo Laigueglia, after making a solo bid for victory in the closing stages. He repeated that feat at May's Eschborn-Frankfurt City Loop, attacking out of a four-man lead group within the race's final kilometre.

Moser won his first UCI World Tour race at the Tour de Pologne in July. During the race's first stage, Moser launched a late attack in the closing kilometre, in Jelenia Góra; he managed to hold off the rest of the field for the stage win. He held the race lead until the fourth stage, when 's Michał Kwiatkowski took the lead through bonus seconds gained at intermediate sprint points. On the penultimate stage, Moser took his second stage victory after passing  rider Sergio Henao in the closing metres, after he had gone off the front with an attack. Moser stayed out of trouble on the final stage, and won the race overall by five seconds, ahead of Kwiatkowski.

In the Grand Prix Cycliste de Montréal, Moser came close to victory as he was part of a group of four escapees that held a very small advantage over the lead group as they crossed the last kilometer mark. 's Alexandr Kolobnev produced an acceleration, but was passed by Moser and Lars Petter Nordhaug, the latter grabbing the victory. Moser held on to second place, two seconds in arrears of the victor, while some members of the chasing group crossed the line only two seconds behind Moser.

2013 season
In February, Moser helped his team-mate Peter Sagan win the Gran Premio Città di Camaiore by pulling the leading group and nullifying attacks such as one from their former team-mate Vincenzo Nibali, now riding for the  team. The following weekend, Moser then took victory at Strade Bianche in Siena, accelerating away from the peloton with around  remaining in pursuit of a four-rider breakaway. He caught up to them and accelerated away from them on the final climb, a steep 16% gradient ramp inside the final kilometre; he led home a  one-two, as Sagan was able to finish in second place.

Major results

2008
 1st Stage 2 Giro della Lunigiana
2010
 2nd Coppa Placci
2011
 1st Giro del Medio Brenta
 1st Trofeo Gianfranco Bianchin
 2nd Trofeo Alcide Degasperi
 3rd GP Capodarco
 5th Overall Girobio
1st Stages 1 & 8
 5th Gran Premio Palio del Recioto
2012
 1st  Overall Tour de Pologne
1st Stages 1 & 6
 1st Trofeo Laigueglia
 1st Eschborn-Frankfurt City Loop
 2nd Grand Prix Cycliste de Montréal
 2nd Trofeo Melinda
 3rd Road race, National Road Championships
 5th Giro di Toscana
 7th Overall Settimana Internazionale di Coppi e Bartali
2013
 1st Strade Bianche
 2nd Eschborn-Frankfurt City Loop
 7th Clásica de San Sebastián
2014
 8th Japan Cup
2015
 1st Stage 8 Tour of Austria
 2nd Time trial, National Road Championships
 7th Cadel Evans Great Ocean Road Race
 10th Time trial, UCI Road World Championships
2016
 3rd  Time trial, UEC European Road Championships
 3rd Time trial, National Road Championships
 3rd GP Miguel Induráin
2018
 1st Trofeo Laigueglia

Grand Tour general classification results timeline

References

External links

Liquigas-Cannondale profile

Cycling Quotient profile

Italian male cyclists
1990 births
Living people
Sportspeople from Trento
Cyclists from Trentino-Alto Adige/Südtirol